Karumadikkuttan is the nickname of a Buddha statue found in Karumady near Alappuzha, Kerala, India. The name literally means boy from Karumady. This 3 feet tall, black granite statue, believed to be old as 9th to 14th century, was abandoned for centuries in a nearby stream named "Karumady thodu". Later in 1930s, Sir Robert Bristow, a colonial British engineer found the statue, and did appropriate actions to protect it. Currently the statue is under the protection of Kerala state government. The left side of the statue is missing. The statue is a subject of historical debate as the reason for its partial destruction is still elusive.

Dalai Lama has visited Karumadi in 1965.

As per travancore state manual the idol of Karumadikkuttan is of Jain Theerthankara. The style of idol is of Jain idol style.

References

Buddha statues
Stone Buddha statues
History of Kerala
Indian Buddhist sculpture